Tony D'Algy (born Antonio Eduardo Lozano Guedes; 1897 – 29 April 1977) was a Portuguese film actor. He appeared in 57 films between 1924 and 1949, including The Boob, a silent comedy where Joan Crawford makes one of her first appearances. He was born in Luanda, Angola, and died in Lisbon, Portugal. He was the older brother of actress Helena D'Algy (born 1906).

Selected filmography
 A Sainted Devil (1924)
 The Rejected Woman (1924)
 Meddling Women (1924)
 Soul Mates (1925)
 The Boob (1926)
 Figaro (1929)
 An Ideal Woman (1929)
 The Incorrigible (1931)
 Whirlwind (1941)
 The White Dove (1942)

References

External links

1897 births
1977 deaths
Portuguese male film actors
Portuguese male silent film actors
People from Luanda
Portuguese people of colonial Angola
Portuguese expatriates in the United States